Garath James McCleary (born 15 May 1987) is a professional footballer who plays as a winger for Wycombe Wanderers. Born in England, he represented the Jamaica national team.

Club career

Early career
McCleary was born in Oxford, Oxfordshire. His football career began with Oxford City, and spent time with Oxford United but never signed a contract with the team despite spending three months with the club.

He joined Slough Town playing in 24 games and scoring on six occasions. He then moved to Bromley in January 2007. In total McCleary made over 40 appearances for Bromley scoring 11 goals. Nottingham Forest manager Colin Calderwood offered him a trial at the City Ground where he did well enough to secure a contract on 31 January 2008.

Nottingham Forest
McCleary made his first team debut as an 87th-minute substitute, in a 1–0 home defeat against Carlisle United, on 3 March 2008. He scored his first goal for the club on 1 April 2008 in injury time, in a 2–0 win at Carlisle. On 5 April he was handed his first start where he was voted Man of the Match as Forest beat Cheltenham Town 3–1 at the City Ground.

In the 2011/12 season McCleary scored nine goals after returning from injury in December 2011; six of which came in March 2012. Four came in a high-scoring game away to Leeds United at Elland Road, where Forest won 7–3. These performances resulted in McCleary being named as the Football League Championship Player of the Month. He was voted Forest's Player of the Season by the Forest supporters, beating Joel Lynch and Chris Gunter into second and third respectively.

Reading
On 16 May 2012 it was announced that McCleary had turned down a new contract at Forest and instead signed a three-year contract at Reading and fulfill his dream of playing in the Premier League. His first goal for Reading came in a 3–3 draw with Fulham.

McCleary signed a new contract with Reading on 3 October 2014, keeping at the club until the summer of 2017, before again extending it on 17 January 2017, this time until the summer of 2020.

Wycombe Wanderers
On 4 November 2020, it was announced by Wycombe Wanderers manager during a live webcast that the club had signed McCleary, who had been training with the club as a free transfer until the end of the current season. He scored his first goal for Wycombe in a 2–2 draw against Preston North End on 5 December 2020.

International career

In October 2012 he was earmarked by the Jamaica Football Federation to play for Jamaica during their 2014 World Cup qualifying campaign. He received his first call up on 24 January 2013 alongside Reading teammates Jobi McAnuff and Adrian Mariappa for the World Cup qualifier against Mexico on 6 February. McCleary started the match and helped Jamaica to a 0–0 draw at the Estadio Azteca.

Career statistics

Club

International

International goals
Scores and results list Jamaica's goal tally first.

Honours
Individual
 Nottingham Forest Player of the Season: 2011–12

References

External links

 Garath McCleary profile at Reading F.C.
 Garath McCleary profile at the Jamaica Football Federation
 
 

1987 births
Living people
Footballers from Oxford
English people of Jamaican descent
Black British sportspeople
English footballers
Jamaican footballers
Jamaica international footballers
Association football wingers
Oxford City F.C. players
Slough Town F.C. players
Bromley F.C. players
Nottingham Forest F.C. players
Reading F.C. players
Wycombe Wanderers F.C. players
Premier League players
English Football League players
National League (English football) players
Southern Football League players
Isthmian League players
2015 Copa América players
2015 CONCACAF Gold Cup players
Copa América Centenario players